Sir Trehawke Herbert Kekewich, 1st Baronet (11 July 1851 – 10 March 1932) was an English barrister and judge.

Kekewich was born at Peamore House, near Exeter, Devon, into an old Devon family. He was the son of Trehawke Kekewich and grandson of the politician Samuel Trehawke Kekewich.  His brother was Major-General Robert Kekewich, and his uncle was the noted judge Sir Arthur Kekewich.

He was educated at Marlborough College and Christ Church, Oxford, and was called to the Bar at the Inner Temple in 1877.

He served as Recorder of Tiverton from 1899 to 1920 and also as chairman of the Devon Quarter Sessions. He was created a baronet in the 1921 New Year Honours.

Kekewich and his wife, Edith, had no children who survived him (he outlived his son Robert Kekewich and his daughter Mildred) and so the baronetcy became extinct on his death.

Footnotes

References
Obituary, The Times, 11 March 1932
 
 Trehawke Kekewich (thePeerage.com)

External links

1851 births
1932 deaths
Lawyers from Exeter
People educated at Marlborough College
Alumni of Christ Church, Oxford
English barristers
Members of the Inner Temple
20th-century English judges
Baronets in the Baronetage of the United Kingdom